Arena Birmingham (known for sponsorship reasons as Utilita Arena Birmingham, and previously as The Barclaycard Arena and originally as the National Indoor Arena) is an indoor arena and sporting venue in central Birmingham, United Kingdom. It is owned by parent company the NEC Group. When it was opened in 1991, it was the largest indoor arena in the UK. The arena was renamed Utilita Arena Birmingham on 15 April 2020.

The arena is located alongside the Birmingham Canal Navigations Main Line's Old Turn Junction and opposite the National Sea Life Centre in Brindleyplace. The building straddles the main Birmingham to Wolverhampton Intercity railway line (originally the Stour Valley Line), but does not have a station of its own. There are three adjoining car parks with a total of 2,156 spaces. Close to the arena is The ICC which is also owned by the NEC Group.

It is currently the third-largest indoor arena in the United Kingdom by capacity. In 2019, the arena had ticket sales of 530,597, which was the 4th highest in the United Kingdom.

Background

The arena was officially opened, as the National Indoor Arena, on 4 October 1991 by the athlete Linford Christie. When it was opened, the arena was intended to be an indoor sporting venue. However, the venue began to host entertainment events shortly after opening.

The arena currently hosts a variety of events including concerts, sporting events and conferences. It has a capacity of up to 15,800 using both permanent seating and temporary seating configurations.

The arena was renamed after it underwent an extensive renovation which was completed at the end of 2014. Michael Bublé opened the renovated arena on 2 December 2014.

In 2018 the arena had ticket sales of 497,443, which was the 4th highest in the United Kingdom.

Naming history
 National Indoor Arena 
 Barclaycard Arena 
 Arena Birmingham

Renovation

In 2012 plans to refurbish and renovate the NIA were approved by Birmingham City Council. The plans included creating a showpiece entrance from the canal-side, three "sky needle" light sculptures, a new glazed facade fronting the canal and new pre-show hospitality elements. The design was by the architecture firm Broadway Malyan and the building contract was awarded to Royal BAM Group in 2013 with an projected finishing date of Winter 2014.

The £26 million redevelopment began in June 2013. The redeveloped arena was officially opened with a performance by singer Michael Bublé on 2 December 2014. It was renamed the "Barclaycard Arena" in November 2014 after Barclaycard won the naming rights for five years, but in May 2016 it was announced that the naming deal would end early, and from September 2017 it would be named Arena Birmingham.

On 16 January 2020, it was announced that the arena will be renamed Utilita Arena Birmingham from 15 April 2020.

Notable events

The arena has been used for several major events in the past, including counting no less than eight constituencies in the hall for the 1992 general election.

Gladiators was recorded at the arena from 1992 to 1999.
1993 IBF World Championships
1995 Netball World Championships
Eurovision Song Contest 1998 
1999 World Judo Championships
 The 2001 Robot Wars Live Tour.
2003 IAAF World Indoor Championships.
Great Britain Davis Cup tennis matches (vs. United States in 1999, vs. Sweden and Thailand in 2002, and vs. Japan in 2016)
BBL Cup and BBL Finals Weekend matches
2003 IBF World Championships
2007 European Athletics Indoor Championships.
The Premier League Darts every year since 2007
2010 European Men's Artistic Gymnastics Championships
2010 European Women's Artistic Gymnastics Championships
2010 Wheelchair Basketball World Championship
2011 Trampoline World Championships
Lee Evans performed here from 17 to 21 September 2014 to record his final stand-up show tour Monsters before his retirement.
Linkin Park performed here as part of the One More Light Tour on 6 July 2017. This was the band's last performance of the European leg, as the remaining show in Manchester were cancelled due to a bombing at the Manchester Arena, where the band was supposed to perform. It was also the final performance of lead singer Chester Bennington before his death on 20 July 2017.
2018 IAAF World Indoor Championships
2022 Commonwealth Games

Ticket sales

NEC Group
Parent company The NEC Group also owns and operates the ICC Birmingham in central Birmingham, and the National Exhibition Centre (NEC) and Resorts World Arena (previously The NEC Arena, LG Arena and Genting Arena), based on The NEC site in nearby Solihull.

References

External links

Construction of the arena's roof

Basketball venues in England
Indoor arenas in England
Sports venues in Birmingham, West Midlands
Badminton venues
Indoor track and field venues
Darts venues
Sports venues completed in 1991
1991 establishments in England
Judo venues
Netball venues in England
2022 Commonwealth Games venues
Gymnastics at the 2022 Commonwealth Games